The 1924 South Carolina Gamecocks football team represented the University of South Carolina during the 1924 Southern Conference football season. Led by Sol Metzger in his fifth and final season as head coach, the Gamecocks compiled an overall record of 7–3 with a mark of 3–2 in conference play, tying for sixth place in the SoCon. The season was notable for its low scoring.

Schedule

References

South Carolina
South Carolina Gamecocks football seasons
South Carolina Gamecocks football